Podarcis tauricus, the Balkan wall lizard, is a common lizard in the family Lacertidae native to south eastern Europe and Asia Minor. It is a terrestrial species found in steppe, grassland, olive groves, cultivated land, meadows, rural gardens, sparsely vegetated sand dunes and scrubby areas.

Description
It is a sturdy deep-headed lizard somewhat resembling a small green lizard. The basic colour is bright green in spring, fading to an olive-green olive-brown in summer. The markings are somewhat variable but may consist of two narrow, pale-coloured dorso-lateral stripes with the central part of the back brownish with black patches. The underparts are white and unblotched, but breeding males develop yellow, orange or red underparts and green throats.

Distribution
South-west Ukraine, Crimea Peninsula, eastern and southern Romania, south-east Hungary, North Macedonia, Bulgaria, mainland Greece, the Ionian Islands, Thassos, western Turkey (Thrace and north western Anatolia), Albania and southern Moldova. south-eastern Czech Republic

Habitat and ecology
Podarcis tauricus is largely a terrestrial lizard inhabiting open areas of grassland such as steppe, meadows and field edges, also in olive groves, traditional farm land, rural gardens, sand dunes with sparse vegetation and occasionally in open scrub.

Females lay two clutches, of between two and ten eggs each, in a year.

Taxonomy
Two subspecies are recognised
Podarcis tauricus tauricus
Podarcis tauricus thasopulae

Conservation status
The Balkan wall lizard is listed by the International Union for Conservation of Nature as being of "least concern". This is because it is a common species wherever there is suitable habitat within its range.

References

Further reading
Fischer, David & Babická, Kamila & Fischerová, Jana & Lerch, Zdeněk & Mikátová, Blanka & Reiter, Antonín & Rehak, Ivan. (2019). Discovery of the Podarcis tauricus population in the Czech Republic (Squamata: Lacertidae). 83. 239–254. 

tauricus
Lizards of Europe
Reptiles described in 1814
Taxa named by Peter Simon Pallas